Shortia is a small genus of subshrubs or perennial herbs in the family Diapensiaceae. There are five species, four in Asia and one in the Appalachian Mountains of eastern North America. They are found in mountainous areas, generally from  elevation. All have restricted ranges and are generally considered rare. Three of the species, S. galacifolia, S. soldanelloides, and S. uniflora are often cultivated. The genus was by Asa Gray named after botanist Charles Wilkins Short. In Gray's diary entry for April 8, 1839, he named the genus after Charles Wilkins Short because the plant was native to America in a region close to where Short lived, which was Kentucky. Short and Gray never met but they corresponded with one another frequently. Short never saw a live nor dried specimen of his namesake genus.

Species

References

Diapensiaceae
Flora of temperate Asia
Taxa named by Asa Gray